La Psychologie de l'Art (The Psychology of Art) is a work of art history  by André Malraux. The book offers an explication of Malraux's philosophy of art via the history of Western painting.

It was originally published in three volumes: The Imaginary Museum (1947); The Artistic Creation (1948); and Aftermath of the Absolute (1949). In 1953 a revised, single-volume edition was published as The Voices of Silence. Stuart Gilbert translated all four books into English.

In France, Malraux's works of art history were touchstones of their time and were a major influence on Jean-Luc Godard, for one, in his own work of critical art history, Histoire(s) du cinéma.

References

French books
Works by André Malraux